Fyrudden is a coastal locality in Valdemarsvik Municipality, Östergötland County, Sweden, located at the extreme southeastern end of a narrow peninsula. The name literally means "the lighthouse point".

County road 212 from Valdemarsvik passes by Gryt to terminate at Fyrudden, and the large north-south waterway of Östergötland archipelago passes nearby.
Fyrudden is thus easily accessible from sea and from land it has become a popular guest  harbor. Apart from harbor facilities, including  Swedish Coast Guard station Ks Gryt, there is also a restaurant, a grocery store, and a bus stop with connections to Valdemarsvik, Söderköping och Norrköping.

External links
 Fyrudden information portal (in Swedish)
 Kuststation Gryt Swedish Coast Guard in Fyrudden (in Swedish)

Populated places in Östergötland County
Populated places in Valdemarsvik Municipality